Paratenuisentis is a genus of parasitic worms belonging to the family Tenuisentidae.

The species of this genus are found in Northern America.

Species:

Paratenuisentis ambiguus

References

Neoechinorhynchida
Acanthocephala genera